Olukorede Adenowo (born March 1, 1966) is the Managing Director of Standard Chartered Bank's Corporate, Commercial, and Institutional Banking business, responsible for Nigeria and West Africa. He is also an executive director on the board of the bank. He was previously the managing director and chief executive officer of Standard Chartered Bank (SCB) in Gambia and Senegal and was the deputy managing director and deputy CEO for SCB, Cameroon. Korede was also a non-executive director at SCB Gambia and Sierra Leone, and he was vice president of the Gambia Bankers Association and trustee of the Institute of Bankers of Gambia.

Early life 
Korede was born on March 1, 1966, in Ibadan, Nigeria, where he had his primary education at Maryhill Convent School and his secondary education at the International School, Ibadan (ISI).

Education 

In 1987, Korede got a BSc. Hon. in Economics at the University of Ife in Osun State, Nigeria, and a Master of Business Administration from the Lagos Business School under the IESE—International Graduate School of Management—at the University of Navarra in Barcelona, Spain. He is an alumnus of INSEAD and Said Business School of Oxford University and a member of the Institute of Chattered Accountants of Nigeria (ICAN)

Career 
Adenowo started his career working for Société Générale Bank Nigeria and Deloitte Nigeria, where he qualified as a chartered accountant in 1990. Deloitte Nigeria honored him with a Distinguished Alumni Award in 2015.

Marriage and children 
Korede Adenowo is married to Jumoke Adenowo. They both have two children, Toluwaloju Adenowo and Toluwalase Adenowo.

References 

1966 births
Living people